Gigi Adamashvili (born 23 September 1998) is a Georgian singer and musician.

Early life
Gigi Adamashvili was born on 23 September 1998 in Tbilisi, Georgia. Adamashvili has been playing guitar since the age of eleven, after being taught by his mother. He performed and won first place at New Star in Tbilisi, Georgia in 2012.

Career

2015–2016
In 2015, at age sixteen, Adamashvili participated in X-Factor Ukraine. He auditioned with the Bob Dylan song, ″Make You Feel my Love″ which has since accumulated over 2.5 million views on Youtube. In 2016, he entered X-Factor Georgia, auditioning with a cover of Wicked Game by Chris Isaak, reaching over 1.5 million views on YouTube. Mentored by Sofia Nizharadze, Adamashvili finished X-Factor Georgia 2016 in second place.

2017-present
Adamashvili toured throughout Georgia in 2017, playing at 20 venues across the country over the course of three months. 
He won the Golden Wave Award after receiving 103078 votes from the public in 2018. Gigi Adamashvili released his first single, ″Yellow Kites″ on Soundcloud in April 2019. His second single, ″BABI″ was released in May 2019 in memory of the late Tamar ″Babi″ Babilua. On the French music platform CLAPCHARTS, song "BABI" hit the new charts and took the first place.

References

External links
official web-page
official Facebook page
Gigi Adamashvili

1998 births
Living people
Folk singers from Georgia (country)
Pop singers from Georgia (country)
Folk-pop singers
Musicians from Tbilisi
21st-century male singers from Georgia (country)